This is a list of historic places in Central Ontario, containing heritage sites listed on the Canadian Register of Historic Places (CRHP), all of which are designated as historic places either locally, provincially, territorially, nationally, or by more than one level of government.

List of historic places

Dufferin County

Haliburton County

Hastings County

Kawartha Lakes

District Municipality of Muskoka

Northumberland County

Parry Sound District

Peterborough County

Prince Edward County

Simcoe County

See also
List of historic places in Ontario
List of National Historic Sites of Canada in Ontario

References

Central Ontario
Central Ontario